The Kosovo Rugby Federation (KRF),, is the governing body for rugby union in Kosovo. The KRF is a member of Rugby Europe.

History
The Kosovo Rugby Federation was founded in 2018 and became a member of Rugby Europe on 3 December 2021. The first chairman of the KRF was Ruari O’Connell, who was the United Kingdom ambassador to Kosovo at that time. The current chairman is Ndrec Musolli who is also a player for the Kosovo national rugby sevens team. The first club rugby competition in Kosovo was held in 2019. Kosovo made its debut in an international rugby event at the 2022 Rugby Europe Sevens Conference 2 tournament held on 11 and 12 June 2022 in Malta.

National rugby teams of Kosovo

Men
 Kosovo - the national men's rugby union team.
 Kosovo 7s - the national men's rugby union seven-a-side team.

Rugby clubs in Kosovo

Mens
Men's rugby clubs in Kosovo include:
Kosovo Roosters
Peja Eagles
Prishtina Bears RFC

In addition, the following club from North Macedonia has played in Kosovo domestic rugby competitions:
Skopje Wild Boars

Women's
Women's rugby clubs in Kosovo include:
Balkan Lynx
R.K. Qikat

See also
 Sport in Kosovo
 Membership of Kosovo in international sports federations

References

External links
 Kosovo Rugby Federation - Official Site

Rugby union governing bodies in Europe
Rugby Europe members
Sports organizations established in 2018
Sports governing bodies in Kosovo